Santiago, officially the City of Santiago, is a 1st class independent component city in the Cagayan Valley region of the Philippines. According to the 2020 census, it has a population of 148,580 people.

It is formerly known as Pueblo de Carig during the time of the Spanish, it is located between southwestern part of Isabela and northwestern boundary of Quirino in Northeastern Luzon island of the Philippines. It is the gateway to the vast plains of Cagayan Valley.

The city sits on a vast area of predominantly flat and fertile land in the Cagayan Valley, surrounded by the Caraballo Mountains to the south, the Great Sierra Madre to the east and the Cordillera Mountain Range to the west alongside the Magat River.

Though statistically grouped by the Philippine Statistics Authority and geographically located within the boundaries of the province of Isabela, as well as part of the province's 4th District, Santiago City is administratively and legally independent from the province as stated in Section 25 of the Local Government Code.

Etymology
The origin of Santiago City can be drawn from the first native settlement discovered by the early Spanish missionaries at the bank of the old Carig River (now Diadi River) from which its original name, Carig, was derived. The early inhabitants were the Gaddangs and the Ibanags. When the Spanish settled in, the city was named Pueblo of Santiago Apostol de Carig, with Santiago as the Spanish name of Saint James the Apostle. In the early 1950s, the Municipal President Vicente Carreon changed the name to simply Santiago. Santiago remained a municipality for 84 years.

History
Santiago was originally a part of the province Cagayan (comprising the whole Cagayan Valley region), which was reorganized as a political subdivision in 1583 with Nueva Segovia as its capital. On May 1, 1856, when the province of Isabela was carved out by a Royal Decree, Santiago was among the towns relinquished to the newly created province. The first five barrios after the Cadastral survey in 1927 were Patul, Batal, Nabbuan, Buenavista and Dubinan.

It was said that there were only about three Filipino-owned sari-sari stores in Santiago in 1917. The settlers acquired most of their merchandise and other provisions from Chinese traders in Echague, the landing zone for products intended for Santiago and other towns, owing to its proximity to the Cagayan River.

It was when the Villa-Verde Trail was opened when things were set in motion. It facilitated the entry of immigrants from various provinces in Luzon to the Cagayan Valley and Santiago absorbed a sizable share of these travelers. The new route served as an impetus for growth and introduced new technologies and business opportunities, and made Santiago a melting pot of different cultures.

In 1942, during World War II, the Japanese forces entered and occupied the town of Santiago. In 1945, the town was liberated by the Filipino soldiers of the 1st, 2nd, 12th, 13th and 15th Infantry Division and the USAFIP-NL 11th Infantry Regiment of the Philippine Commonwealth Army, the 1st Constabulary Regiment of the Philippine Constabulary and the recognized guerrilla fighter units.

Santiago survived through world wars, although badly damaged, and from then on developed to become the leading trading and commercial city in Cagayan Valley.

Cityhood

On December 17, 1993, the bill converting Santiago into an independent component city was approved by the Lower House spearheaded by the then Mayor Jose "Pempe" Miranda. In the following year, the Senate Committee on Local Government approved another public hearing dated February 23, 1994.

On May 5, 1994, President Fidel V. Ramos signed Republic Act 7720, making Santiago the first city in Cagayan Valley and 5th independent component city, after Cotabato City, Dagupan, Naga, and Ormoc. The plebiscite was held on July 6, 1994, showed that voters approved this conversion.

On February 14, 1998, Republic Act 8528 repealed this statute transforming it to a component city. It was not until December 29, 1999, when the Supreme Court contested the validity of the latter decision and favored Santiago to be once again an independent component city.

Geography
The total land area the city is 80% flat or nearly level land in the portions of northwestern, eastern and western parts of the city. While adjacent areas have gently undulating and moderately rolling areas, and the remaining areas constitute steeply undulating and rolling lands. The Dariuk Hills is the highest point in the city.

The geographic coordinate of the city lies between 16º35’00” to 16º47’30” north latitude and 121º25’00” to 121º37’00” east longitude.

Barangays
Santiago City is politically subdivided into 37 barangays. These barangays are headed by elected officials: Barangay Captain, Barangay Council, whose members are called Barangay Councilors. All are elected every three years.

Climate

The city has a climate with no pronounced wet or dry season. Usually, the city has a considerably dry climate with minimum rainfall. Annual and daily temperature variation is minimal.

Demographics

Religion

The dominant religion in the city is Roman Catholic (Saint James the Apostle Parish in Barangay Centro West and Saint Francis of Assisi Parish in Barangay Rizal). However, other Christian sectors are also present in Santiago such as Iglesia ni Cristo, United Methodist Church, Pentecostal Missionary Church of Christ (4th Watch), Jesus is Lord Church, Christ the Rock Church and the Church of Jesus Christ of Latter-day Saints. Being a district full of different cultures, such as Indians, Muslim, and Chinese, several religious groups have also opened their places of worship to the public, such as Chinese Temple and Muslim Mosque. The "Gurudwara Jagat Sudhar Indian Sikh Temple" is at Doña Aurora St in Santiago where free Indian vegetarian cuisine is served to all visitors on sundays.

Economy 

Home of several business enterprises, banking institutions, educational entities, as well as manufacturing companies, Santiago City is considered the Commercial and Trading Center of Cagayan Valley and tagged as the Investment Hub of the North.

Robinsons Land Corporation has launched Robinsons Place Santiago as its pioneer mall in Cagayan Valley. Vista Land and Lifescapes, Inc. built its first horizontal subdivision in the Valley with Camella Isabela Communities, Inc. In 2013, it launched another project named Camella Santiago. In 2018, Camella Santiago expanded and named as Camella Santiago Trails. It is building its banner mall in the Cagayan Valley Region, the Vista Mall Santiago. Another multi-national real estate developer will soon be built its prime subdivision, Primeworld Suburb, owned by Primeworld land holdings Company.

The head-office of Grupo Marilens, the largest homegrown corporation in the region, is in Santiago City. Aljay, an agri-chemical company, has a presence in the city and has a manufacturing plant for agrichemical, fertilizer and feeds supply for poultry and piggery and the only manufacturing plant for fertilizer and agrichemical in the region.

Three of the biggest TV networks in the country (i.e. ABS-CBN, GMA7, TV5) stationed their regional networks and relay stations in the city. San Miguel Corp., Pepsi Cola, Purefoods, Digitel and PLDT also operate in the city while different car companies abound(i.e. Mitsubishi, Nissan, Hyundai, KIA, Ford,Geely,MG  and other car companies as well as Yamaha and Honda Motors). Toyota,Suzuki,Changan and Foton build their showroom in neighboring town to lessen their tax obligation.The National Food Authority competes with local traders to stabilize prices.Even no presence of SM city still the economy is competitive and that because of its strategic location that's SM couldn't consider this factor to build their mall. Wilcon depot,they use santiago city as their marketing strategy but they build their warehouse in neighboring town to lessen also their tax obligation.

Santiago City houses some of the biggest hospitals in the region. De Vera's Medical Center, Callang General Hospital and Medical Center and Santiago Adventist Hospital are private hospitals. The Southern Isabela Medical Center is the biggest public hospital while Flores Memorial Hospital and Medical Center is the oldest in the city. Santiago City also has Renmar Specialists' Hospital, which is a specialty hospital for complicated cases of pulmonology and orthopedics. Santiago Medical City is the latest addition. The city's location is key to the growth of smaller hospitals like Renmar Hospital and Corado Hospital.

Based on the 2016 City Competitiveness Index, Santiago is the fastest growing local economy in the entire Philippines and is now ranked 51 in terms of economy size among all cities in the country.

Despite rapid industrialization, agriculture is still the main source of livelihood. The main crops are rice, corn, and high-value fruits and vegetables. The city is where imposing grain stations can be found. Rice mills abound. It is the pivotal place for crops where harvests from Ifugao, Kalinga, Quirino, Nueva Vizcaya, and parts of Isabela are transported either to Nueva Ecija, Bulacan, Pangasinan or Batangas. In addition to the city's product is muscovado sugar which the local government has been promoting for export.

During the Miranda Flagship, the city Government adopted the parental AxR Hybrid rice seed production as its flagship program for agriculture, which produces the offspring F1 Hybrid rice seed. This rice variety makes a phenomenal yield of 249 per ha. doubling the income of Santiago City farmers per cropping, and is expected to bring Santiago City over 2 billion in income and also additional taxes of 17 million and the national government of 33 million per year.

After the previous leadership, The Navarro Administration added more life in culture and strengthen the livelihood of the people. The Navarros' spearheaded a unique program for farmers in planting on mid-summer and harvest by early September side by side in focusing on high-value fruits.

Government

Local government

The city is governed by a mayor-council system. There are ten city councilors. The council is the official governing body of the city, also known as the Sanguniang Panglungsod. The council agenda is presided over by the city vice mayor. Being an independent-component city with its own charter, the city is not subject to the jurisdiction of Isabela province, of which it is geographically a part. No native was ever elected mayor of Santiago since the Philippine became a Commonwealth and Republic.

Elected officials

Congress representation

Santiago is represented in the Philippine Congress as part of Isabela's 4th legislative district. Currently, Joseph S. Tan is the city's representative.

Culture and tourism

The majority of the population speaks Tagalog and Ilocano. English is the medium of instruction in schools and is generally understood and spoken especially in the business community.

Tourism is a new industry in the city. Serving as the jump-off point in northeastern Luzon for tourists, many landmarks are developed. Tourist spots near Santiago are Quirino Province, Magat Dam in Isabela, Banaue Rice Terraces in Cordillera, and white sand beaches in Aurora Province facing the Pacific Ocean.

Festivals
 Balamban Dance Festival (formerly known as Balamban Butterfly Festival) - In the year 2014, a new festival was conceptualized by the city government to celebrate Santiago's cityhood anniversary. Balamban which means butterfly is a cultural dance of lowland Christians that originated in Santiago City. The dance depicts the graceful movement and fluttering of butterflies that throng Dariuk Hills' scented gardens. It is usually danced during wedding celebrations in Santiago.
Pattaradday Festival - From 2006 to 2013 during the Navarro administration, Santiago's cityhood anniversary was celebrated through Pattaradday, a concept owned by a private organization called Pattaradday Foundation Inc. Pattaradday means unity in Ibanag. Ibanags are historically said to be the first settlers of the locality. It celebrated the unity of the ethno-linguistic groups that have merged in the city to make it the melting pot of culture of Region II. The festival won Hall of Fame in the Search for Best Tourism Event in the Philippines conducted by the Association of Tourism Officers of the Philippines. It featured different festivities participated in by many street dances from all over the country.
"Redireksyon" thru the initiative of former City Mayor Jose "Pempe" C. Miranda
 Feast of St. James the Apostle (Santiago de Carig) - Celebrated every July 25 of the year is the Feast of Saint James the Apostle, the Patron Saint of the city. It features the life history of the patron saint as it saves the Christians against the Moros (based on the battle of Battle of Clavijo which, Saint James the Apostle appeared as "Santiago Matamoros" or Saint James the Moor-Killer) through Sarswela and the "Grand Batalla" (Grand Battle) or the Moro-Moro, a dance choreography depicting the battle.

Insfrastructure
Santiago City is the gateway to the plains of Cagayan Valley. It connects several provinces with the following major roads crossing the city:

Pan-Philippine Highway
Santiago - Tuguegarao Road
Santiago - Saguday Road
Santiago - Diffun Road (Patul Road)
Santiago Bypass Road (Sinsayon to Rizal)
Santiago Bypass Road (Rizal to Divisoria)
Santiago Bypass Road (Sinsayon to Baluarte)planned
Santiago Bypass Road (Baluarte to Divisoria)planned
Santiago City Road
Alvarez Blvd

Serving as a bridge to the region's provincial network, numerous bus terminals are present in the city. These include, Victory Liner, Northeast Luzon Bus Line (formerly Nelbusco), GV Florida Transport, Five Star Bus Company, EMC LBS bus lines, GMW trans (Santiago-Laoag-Vigan-Abra via Cagayan province among others. By air via Cauayan Airport.

The Integrated Transport Terminal and Commercial Complex has also been established to cater for all public utility jeepneys, buses, and vans that operate from nearby provinces and localities to the city. Additional to city transport is the taxi, first in the city and whole Region 2.

Education
Notable school institutions located in the city are the School of Saint James the Apostle (formerly La Salette Elementary School), Santiago Cultural Institute (Chinese School), Children First School, Infant Jesus Montessori School, AMA Computer College Santiago City Campus, TAPS, Patria Sable Corpus College, University of La Salette and Northeastern College, one of the oldest schools in the region. The Southern Isabela College of Arts and Trades is the biggest vocational school operating in the city. Also, there are numerous international schools operating in the city.

The Schools Division Office of Santiago City governs the city's public education system. The division office is a field office of the DepEd in Cagayan Valley region. The office governs the public elementary and public high schools throughout the city.

Due to lack of own state university,student from santiago have struggle regarding their study.

Media
Radio stations that are available in the city. Some stations may not be in operation.

AM Radio
 828 kHz DZRH Nationwide (DWRH; Manila Broadcasting Company) (repeater)
 DWSI 864 Sonshine Radio Santiago (DWSI; Sonshine Media Network International
 1143 DZMR Missions Radio (DZMR; Far East Broadcasting Company)
 DWEY 1179 Life Radio Santiago (DWET; End-Time Mission Broadcasting Service)

FM Radio
 92.9 Brigada News FM Cauayan (DWYI; Brigada Mass Media Corporation) (Served and the airwaves of Cauayan, Isabela and expanded areas)
 93.7 Radyo Natin Santiago (DWTR; Manila Broadcasting Company/Radyo Natin Network)
 94.5 MHz Love Radio Santiago (DWIP; Manila Broadcasting Company)
 96.9 Big Radio (Rajah Broadcasting Network) (Soon to Air)
 97.7 Sweet Radio (DWMX; Soundstream Broadcasting Corporation/Catholic Media Network)
 100.1 MHz DWIZ Isabela (Own operated by Aliw Broadcasting Corporation and Barangay Rizal LPFM)
 102.1 Radio Maria Isabela (DZRC; Radio Maria Philippines/Catholic Media Network) (repeater)
 104.9 XFM (Palawan Broadcasting Corporation/Yes2Health Advertising, Inc.)
106.7 MHz Radio Adventist Hospital
107.9 MHz Taps Radio

Television
List of television stations that are in operation in the city. Some stations may no longer in operation.
 Channel 2 - ABS-CBN Corp. (DWAT) (defunct)
 Channel 7 - GMA Network Inc. (DWLE)
 Channel 21 - Interactive Broadcast Media, Inc.
 Channel 23 - Amcara Bctg. Net. Inc (DWWA) (defunct)
 Channel 25 - Mediascape, Inc. (DWDH)
 Channel 29 - Radio Philippines Network, Inc.
 Channel 31 - First United Broadcasting Corp.
 Channel 37 - Swara Sug Media Corporation (DWSA)

Cable and Satellite TV
Regal Cable TV Network
New City Cable System
Cignal TV
G Sat

Notable personalities

Entertainment
4th Impact (formerly 4th Power, Cercado Sisters, Gollayan Sisters, and MICA) is a girl group consisting of sisters Almira, Irene, Mylene and Celina Cercado, who have been singing and dancing together and joining international contests since 2001.
 Peter Musñgi, the voice of ABS-CBN both in radio and television
 Karina Bautista, a former Pinoy Big Brother Otso housemate.
 Nabiha Kaseem, a former Pinoy Big Brother Otso housemate.

Military
 Florence Finch, a Filipino-American member of the World War II resistance against the Japanese occupation of the Philippines.

Politics
 Heherson Alvarez, a Philippine politician (then Senator of the Phils.)

Sister cities

Local
 Dagupan
 Makati
 Marikina
 Puerto Princesa

International
 Rustavi, Georgia
 Santo Domingo, Dominican Republic

References

External links

Government website

General information
 League of Cities of the Philippines
 DOT Region 2
 City Profile at the National Competitiveness Council of the Philippines
 Local Governance Performance Management System
 [ Philippine Standard Geographic Code]
 Philippine Census Information
  Information about Santiago City
 Santiago City at the Isabela Government Website

Social media
City Government of Santiago on Facebook

 
Cities in Isabela (province)
Independent component cities in the Philippines
Populated places established in 1858
1858 establishments in the Philippines